The pre-season of the 2018–19 NBL season, the 41st season of Australia's National Basketball League, started on 8 June 2018 and ended 5 October 2018.

The pre-season featured games in China and Malaysia. As well, it featured the NBLxNBA 2018 Tour in which five NBL teams played a total of seven games.

Games

2018 NBL All-Australian Tour of China 

The NBL All-Australian Team won the series 2-1.

Adelaide 36ers pre-season

Brisbane Bullets pre-season

Cairns Taipans pre-season

Illawarra Hawks pre-season

Seri Mutiara Cup 2018

Semi-final

Final 

Illawarra Hawks won the tournament.

Melbourne United pre-season

Perth Wildcats pre-season

Sydney Kings pre-season

2018 NBL Blitz 
A pre-season tournament featuring all eight teams was held on 20–23 September 2018 in Bendigo and Ballarat. Bendigo Stadium hosted four games of the NBL Blitz on September 20 while Ballarat Minerdome hosted eight games from September 22–23. Both cities also hosted a range of community activities featuring NBL stars. The winners received the sixth annual Loggins-Bruton Cup.

Day 1 Bendigo Stadium

Day 2 Ballarat Minerdome

Day 3 Ballarat Minerdome

The Adelaide 36ers won the 2018 NBL Blitz championship.

NBLxNBA 2018 Tour 
Five NBL teams  will play a total of seven games against NBA teams in the 2018 pre-season.

References

Pre-season